Dion Scott (born 1 April 1970) is a former Australian rules footballer who played for the Sydney Swans, Brisbane Bears and Brisbane Lions in the Australian Football League (AFL) during the 1990s.

A Tasmanian, Scott was brought up in Ulverstone but played his early football at Devonport. His AFL career was hampered by constant injuries, the first of which came when he damaged his vertebra while training with Sydney at Maroubra beach in 1991. He only managed six appearances for the Swans in three seasons and in the 1992 AFL draft was traded to Brisbane. Scott played three finals in 1996, including Brisbane's one point Qualifying Final win over Essendon, in which he contributed three goals.

The Bears merged with Fitzroy in 1997 to form the Brisbane Lions and Scott was a foundation player, kicking two goals in their opening round loss to Adelaide. He later played with the Redland Australian Football Club.

References

Holmesby, Russell and Main, Jim (2007). The Encyclopedia of AFL Footballers. 7th ed. Melbourne: Bas Publishing.

1970 births
Living people
Sydney Swans players
Brisbane Bears players
Brisbane Lions players
Devonport Football Club players
Redland Football Club players
Australian rules footballers from Tasmania
Allies State of Origin players
Tasmanian State of Origin players
Tasmanian Football Hall of Fame inductees